The 1998 All Japan Grand Touring Car Championship was the sixth season of Japan Automobile Federation GT premiere racing. It was marked as well as the sixteenth season of a JAF-sanctioned sports car racing championship dating back to the All Japan Sports Prototype Championship. The GT500 class champion was the  #23 Pennzoil NISMO Nissan Skyline GT-R driven by Érik Comas and Masami Kageyama, and the GT300 class champion was the #25 Team Taisan Jr with Tsuchiya MR2 driven by Keiichi Suzuki and Shingo Tachi, who won a record five championship races, plus the post-season all-star race, giving them a total of six wins in 1998.

The season was marred by a horrific crash at the All Japan Fuji GT Race on May 3, 1998, when Ferrari Club of Japan driver Tetsuya Ota lost control of his Ferrari F355 in heavy rain and fog, and crashed into the stationary Porsche 911 of Jukuchou (Tomohiko) Sunako. Ota's car erupted into flames upon impact, and fellow racer Shinichi Yamaji rushed to extinguish the fire. Ota suffered severe burns and nerve damage that would force him to retire from full-time racing. Sunako suffered a broken leg, but would continue to race in the series later on.

1998 also saw the first GT500 class victory for Honda, at the Japan Special GT Cup at Fuji Speedway.

Schedule

Season results

Point Ranking

GT500

Drivers

GT300 Class (Top 5)

Drivers

References

External links
 Super GT/JGTC official race archive 
 1998 season results 

Super GT seasons
JGTC